Kyaymyin Monastery, also known as the Yandabo Ywaza Monastery is a historic royal Buddhist monastery in Mandalay, Burma. The monastery, located on 62nd Street, was originally established by the village chief of Yandabo, in 1878. It was subsequently renovated by Kyaymyin Mibaya, a minor consort of King Mindon Min. The monastery’s roof is three-tiered and engraving works on the entrance stairs are impressively featured.

See also 

 Kyaung

References 

Monasteries in Myanmar
Buddhist temples in Mandalay
19th-century Buddhist temples
Religious buildings and structures completed in 1878